The Ypacaraí Festival has been held in the city of Ypacaraí, Paraguay, since 1971, between August and September. It is a folklore festival organized with great emphasis on all kinds of cultural manifestations.

The purpose is to keep alive the memory of great people who have become icons in diverse artistic disciplines. Above all, it is to promote appreciation of art.

History
The Festival of the Lake, as it is called, started in 1971, the initiative of a group of Ypacaraí citizens who were fond of folklore, with the purpose of celebrating the anniversary of the foundation of the district. The first festival was organized in September.

It presented a valid alternative to encourage a love of the things that were authentically national, against the new musical tendencies of foreign origin that had fast acceptance among young people.

In the first festival, the organization paid homage to Demetrio Ortiz, author of the Guarania (music genre) that is representative of the city “Recuerdos de Ypacaraí” (Memories of Ypacaraí), who in spite of the hard regimen that ruled the country in those times, could make a presence at the festival.

The first festival took place in the club “24 de Mayo”, on a small stage. The very good acceptance of the population towards the event encouraged the producers to go a step further and repeat it the following year for a greater audience and with many more national talents.

Stages of the festival
The festival has come through two stages.

In the first stage, the festival was all about maintaining the traditional values of the cultural expressions of the country through the dance, poetry and craftsmanship, reaching its culminating point in the 1980s.

The second stage started when the organization decided to assume also a defense of human rights, which they considered were not being respected by the current government of President General Stroessner. This resulted in the festival being prohibited in 1986, by a resolution of the Department of the Interior.

However, the people of Ypacaraí did not abandon hope of continuing this activity. They took courage and received the support of the entire country and the festival moved to the property of the parish church, all with police custody.

In 1989 with the overthrow of the dictatorial government and the arriving of democracy, the festival was reborn with much more expectation.

Festival with international presence
Since its first years, the festival had a fluent exchange with other international festivals, similar in their objectives of making known and gives importance to the culture of the country.

Delegations from this festival participated in Argentina's festivals of Santa Fe, Córdoba, the Folklore National Festival of Pirané, in Chile in the Folklore Festival of Yacuiba, and also in Brazil and Bolivia.

The delegations from other countries also came to the festival of the Lago Ypacaraí.

International exposure or participation
Since 1973 other international groups joined the festival, they were Los del Suquia, from Argentina, Los Carabajal, Los Cantores del Alba, La Compañía Argentina de Danza, Teresa Parodi and many others.

From Brazil participated groups such as: Ballet Primitivo del Arte Negro from the state of Pernambuco, Xaxado, from Paraíba. From Peru came the group of ballet Peru Negro, Aukamaru, Roberto Parra and many others. Mexico was present too with the Mariachi Los Pasajeros, Mariachi Nacional of Mexico among others.

Other groups of artists from Uruguay, Chile and Bolivia also have participated in the festival. The list would be too long to name all the people. The festival did not stick only to the musical; from it was born the first municipal school of ballet, which allowed the diffusion of this art, and with time, other artistic manifestations also added to this festival.

Awards
In 1976, it was instituted the trophy “Recuerdos de Ypacaraí” (Memories of Ypacaraí), which was granted by a specially selected jury in every edition of the festival, it was national and international.

Nowadays it can be said that the Festival of Lago Ypacaraí is the most famous in Paraguay, of all the Latin American Folklore festivals.

Homage people in the festival
The following is a list of people that have been honored in the different editions of the festival, with the passing of time, the organization added more categories such as folkloric dancing and local craftsmanship.

In 2006, homage was made to Renée Ferrer in the festival of poetry for the second time. In 2001, the organizing commission decided to include among the list of homage the people the artisans too.

Festival of Lago Ypacaraí

 1971, Demetrio Ortiz
 1972, Félix de Ypacaraí / María Cristina Gómez Rabito
 1973, Alberto de Luque
 1974, Diosnel Chase
 1975, Luís A. del Paraná
 1976, Teófilo Escobar
 1977, Agustín Barboza
 1978, Mujer paraguaya compañera del artista
 1979, Florentín Giménez
 1980, Eladio Martínez
 1981, Mauricio Cardozo Ocampo
 1982, Félix Fernández
 1983, Darío Gómez Serrato
 1984, Teodoro S. Mongelós
 1985, Músicos de la Epopeya del Chaco
 1986, 1987 y 1988, PROHIBIDO
 1989, Maneco Galeano
 1990, Augusto Roa Bastos
 1991, Dúo Quintana-Escalante
 1992, Alejandro Cubilla
 1993, Juan Alfonso Ramírez y los Indios
 1994, José Magno Soler
 1995, Zulema de Mirkin
 1996, Vocal Dos
 1997, El pueblo
 1998, Rigoberto Arévalo
 1999, Los hermanos González
 2000, Juan Cancio Barreto
 2001, Efrén Echeverría
 2002, Carlos Federico Abente
 2003, Carlos Niz
 2004, Neneco Norton
 2005, Ricardo Flecha
 2006, Epifanio Méndez Fleitas
 2007, Oscar Safuán

Festival of Poetry
 1990, Elvio Romero
 1991, María Luisa Artecona de Thompson
 1992, Félix de Guarania
 1993, Renée Ferrer de Arréllaga
 1994, Gladys Carmagnola
 1995, Luis María Martínez
 1996, Ramiro Domínguez
 1997, José Luis Appleyard
 1998, Elsa Wiezell
 1999, Oscar Ferreiro
 2000, Teresa Servián de Sosa
 2001, Pedro Encina Ramos
 2002, Ramón Silva
 2003, Mercedes Jané
 2004, Aurelio González Canale
 2005, Rubén Bareiro Saguier
 2006, Renée Ferrer de Arréllaga
 2007, Mario Rubén Álvarez

Festival of Theater
 1982, José Arturo Alsina
 1983, Máxima Lugo
 1984, José L. Melgarejo
 1985, Josefina Plá
 1989, Alcibiades González Delvalle
 1990, Ernesto Báez
 1991, Sin datos precisos
 1992, Rudi Torga
 1993, Tito Chamorro
 1994, Pedro Moliniers
 1995, Sara Giménez
 1996, Erenia López
 1997, María Helena Sachero
 1998, Edith Errecartes
 1999, César Álvarez Blanco y Rafael Rojas Doria (Los Compadres)
 2000, Jesús Pérez
 2001, Victoria Figueredo
 2002, Nizugan
 2003, Mercedes Jané
 2004, Luís D’Oliveira
 2005, Humberto Gulino
 2006, Jorge Ramos
 2007, Compañía Roque Sánchez-Graciela Pastor

Festival of Dancing
 1990, Celia Ruiz de Domínguez y Gilda Ruiz de Segovia
 1991, María Magdalena Duarte Melgarejo y Emilio Barrientos
 1992, Petronita Vinader
 1993, María Balbina Vera
 1994, Rosa Vera de Barúa y Dora Rabito de Sosa
 1995, Lilian Garicoche
 1996, Elizabeth Vinader
 1997, Mercedes Vera
 1998, Sussy Sacco
 1999, Mirtha Cabañas de Bonzi
 2000, Pamela Fretes
 2001, Cándido Duarte y Gladys Lenguaza
 2002, Reina Cáceres
 2003, Natalia Ramos y Felicita Patiño de Márquez
 2004, Mirta Lenguaza
 2005, Katy Ortega
 2006, Beatriz Frutos
 2007, Zully Vinader

Festival of Craftsmanship
 2001, Marcial Medina
 2002, Indalecio Chávez y Del Rosario Sanabria
 2003, Rosa Brítez
 2004, Federico Giménez
 2005, Benjamín Patiño y Serafín Montanía
 2006, Alejandrino García
 2007, Ramón Ayala Salim

See also
List of festivals in South America

References
 Festival del Lago Ypacaraí on Facebook
 Festival del Lago Ypacaraí at Bienvenido a Paraguay

External links 
 Viva Paraguay
 Secretaria Nacional de Turismo

Festivals in Paraguay
Central Department
Folk festivals in Paraguay